The New Zealand Chess Federation (NZCF) is a chess federation in New Zealand.

The first chess club in New Zealand was formed in September 1863 in Dunedin, while the New Zealand Chess Association came into being in the 1870s. The association, refounded in 1892, conducts the annual championship, usually held in the Christmas – New Year period. The Australian master C. J. S. Purdy stated in 1955 that New Zealand holds the record for annual tournaments for a national chess championship.

New Zealand was one of the earliest countries to make use of telegraphic interclub chess as a method of play. Christchurch beat Nelson in two consultation games in 1866. The first interclub match was played between Canterbury and Otago in 1869. The Bledisloe Cup, presented by the Governor-General in 1933, was until recently competed for annually in this way.

Prominent players 
 Ortvin Sarapu (1924–1999), International Master, originally an Estonian, sometimes known as "Mr Chess", won or shared the New Zealand Chess Championship 20 times from 1952 to 1990
 Murray Chandler (1960–), chess grandmaster

See also

 New Zealand Chess Championship
 Fédération Internationale des Échecs (FIDE)
 International Correspondence Chess Federation (ICCF)

References

External links
 
 NZ Chess Magazine

National members of the Asian Chess Federation
Chess in New Zealand
Chess
1863 establishments in New Zealand
1892 establishments in New Zealand
Sports organizations established in 1863
Sports organizations established in 1892
Chess organizations
1892 in chess